This is a list of national swimming records for the Dominican Republic. These are the fastest times ever swum by a swimmer representing the country.

These records are kept/maintained by the Dominican Republic's national swimming federation: Federación Dominicana de Natación (FEDONA).

All records were set in finals unless noted otherwise.

Long Course (50 m)

Men

Women

Mixed relay

Short Course (25 m)

Men

Women

Mixed relay

Notes

References
General
Dominican Republic Long Course records January 2023 updated
Specific

External links
FEDONA web site
Dominican Republic Swimming Records page

Dominican Republic
Records
Swimming
Swimming